Basket Dome is a granite dome in Yosemite National Park, United States.

Basket Dome was named from a Native American legend involving a woman carrying a basket, who was turned by anger into stone, forming the dome.

References

Granite domes of Yosemite National Park
Mountains of Mariposa County, California